Radmila Manojlović (born 25 August 1985), better known as Rada Manojlović, is a Serbian singer, widely known for being the runner-up on the singing competition show Zvezde Granda in 2007.

Life and career
Manojlović was born on 25 August 1985 in Požarevac, SFR Yugoslavia and grew up in the nearby village of Četereže.

In 2003, Manojlović released her first album Ćao bezobrazni, which failed to reach commercial succes. In 2007, Manojlović rose to public attention as a contestant on the third season of the singing competition Zvezde Granda, where she finished in 2nd place to Dušan Svilar. She released her album Deset ispod nule under Grand Production in 2009, which was sold in 180,000 copies. 

In February 2011, Rada won the Female Folk Singer of the Year Award at the Oskar Popularnosti. Also that year, she released Marakana, which yielded several hit songs, like the title track, "Nije meni", "S mora na planine" and "Mešaj mala" featuring Saša Matić. It was sold in 120,000 copies. In the following years, she released numerous standalone singles, such as: "Alkotest", "Glatko" (2014), "Metropola", "Biseri i svila" (2016) with Haris Berković and "Svadba" (2019) with Emil Đulović. 

At the beginning of 2016, Manojlović was announced as a judge on the second season of the children's version of Zvezde Granda, called Neki novi klinci.

Persona life
Between 2008 and 2012, Manojlović was in a relationship with fellow-Zvezde Granda contestant Milan Stanković.

Following her breakup with Stanković, she began dating basketball manager Momir Gajić. In September 2015, it was reported that the two had ended their relationship.

In 2016, she began an on again-off again relationship with the 2015 winner of Zvezde Granda, Haris Berković. In October 2022, Manojlović made a statement that she is no longer together with Berković.

Discography
Studio albums
Ćao bezobrazni (2003)
Deset ispod nule (2009)
Marakana (2011)

Compilation albums
Grand dame 3 (with Tanja Savić and Milica Pavlović, 2020)

Filmography

References

External links
 
 

1985 births
Living people
Musicians from Požarevac
Serbian folk-pop singers
21st-century Serbian women singers
Grand Production artists